Big World is a 1986 live album of original songs by Joe Jackson.

Big World may also refer to:
 Big World (Stevie McCrorie album), 2016
 Big World (Conrad Sewell song), a 2019 song by Australian musician Conrad Sewell
 Big World Pictures, an American film production company

See also
 Big World Cafe, a 1989 British TV music show
 The Big World of Little Adam, a series of U.S. television cartoons that debuted in 1964
 A Great Big World, an American musical duo from New York
 Big Big World (disambiguation)
 Big World Small World, a 2000 album by Smith & Mighty
 Elizabeth Stanton's Great Big World, an American educational television series
 Little People, Big World, an American reality television series that premiered in 2006